Demassieux is a surname. Notable people with the surname include:

 Claude Demassieux (born 1946), French politician
 Nathalie Demassieux (1884–1961), French chemist and academic

See also
 Jeanne Demessieux

Surnames of French origin
French-language surnames